Andrew Cowan (1936–2019) was a Scottish rally driver

Andrew Cowan or Andy Cowan may also refer to:

Andrew Cowan (soldier) (1841–1919), American soldier
Andrew Cowan (writer) (born 1960), English writer
Andy Cowan, American writer and script consultant
Andy Cowan (musician), Australian musician